The New York Society of Model Engineers (NYSME) was originally incorporated in 1926 in New York City. There are published records that show the Society existed as early as 1901. In its early years, the organization moved to and from various locations throughout Manhattan. AT that time it was basically a gentlemen's club of members who were interested in all types of model building. Model Trains at the time were just division of the Society's activities. Society members built models of everything. They were noted for building miniatures and models of steam engines, boats, automobiles, airplanes, buildings, mechanical items, electrical items. In 1926 the Society was formalized and incorporated under the laws of the State of New York. This was done so that the Society could obtain a permit to use a lake in New York City's Central Park for model motor boat races. It was also at this time that the Society began construction of its first Model Railroad "The Union Connecting". Over the next twenty years, the Society moved from its original location to two other locations. Each move doubling the size of the previous location and of course doubling the size of the model train layout. During WW2 many Society members were called to service in the Armed Forces. Regrettably, the largest of the layouts had to be dismantled. The location of the layout in the basement of the Astor Building was requested for the war effort. The dismantling was done with care, with salvaged usable materials going into scrap drives for the War effort. As members returned after the War a new location was searched for. This led to an invitation from the Lackawanna Railroad to move into their Passenger Terminal in Hoboken,NJ. They had the space for what would become the largest model railroad in the world at that time. The space? Only the ornate waiting room for the recently discontinued ferry boats to 23rd Street in New York City. Here the layout was built. It was based on the Lackawanna Railroad from Hoboken to Scranton, Pa. It was magnificent; from the scale model of the Hoboken Terminal to the soaring Delaware Water Gap. During the early-1950s the organization moved to its current location in Carlstadt, New Jersey.

Today, The organization features two operating model railroad displays. One railroad, The Union Connecting, models two rail   "O"-Scale. (1/4" to the foot) The other railroad, The Union, Hoboken, and Overland, models "HO" scale. (3.5mm to the foot). NYSME holds public exhibitions of the layouts. One for three weekends between Thanksgiving and Christmas The second, also for three weekends in the early spring. The Society does hold work or operating sessions every Wednesday, Friday night starting around 7 p.m. and most of the day on Saturdays.  Visitors are always welcome to come by but there is no guarantee that any trains will be operating as members may be doing work on the layouts.

Full members of the Society are allowed to use all the facilities of the organization. We have an extensive railroad library of video tapes, books, and magazines. Full members are also allowed free access to the Society's machine shops and tools. In addition, full members are allowed access to both "O" and "HO" scale layouts following the completion of training in control systems and operating the layouts. Both layouts are large and operate very similar to prototype railroad operations. New members "train" with experience members and it does not take long to "Learn the road".

The Society is a 501:c-3 non-profit organization dedicated to the promotion of the hobby of model railroading and the preservation of American railroad history. Incorporated in 1926, it is the oldest model railroad club in America. They are located in Carlstadt, New Jersey, United States.

References

External links
 

Rail transport modelling associations
Non-profit organizations based in New Jersey
Clubs and societies in New York City
Organizations established in 1926
Clubs and societies in New Jersey